Carassioides is a genus of cyprinid fish that occurs in East and Southeast Asia.  There are currently four recognized species.

Species
Carassioides acuminatus (J. Richardson, 1846)
Carassioides argentea V. H. Nguyễn, 2001
Carassioides macropterus V. H. Nguyễn, 2001
Carassioides phongnhaensis  V. H. Nguyễn, 2003

References